In Your Room is the debut single from Australian actress/singer Toni Pearen, released in November 1992.  The single debuted at #54 on the Australian ARIA top 100 singles chart dated week ending 22 November 1992, and rose to its peak of #10 week ending 17 January 1993. The single spent 17 weeks in the top 50, with 1 week spent out of the chart to re-enter at 50 the following week ending 21 March 1993 and 30 weeks in the top 100.  It achieved an ARIA gold certification for shipments exceeding 35,000.

At the time her music career began, Pearen had been a popular cast member of Australian drama series E Street.  Following in the footsteps of Kylie Minogue, several Australian female soap actresses launched a pop career, to varying degrees of success.  Toni Pearen achieved two consecutive top ten hits in Australia, but subsequent singles and an album were less successful.

Track listing
CD and Cassingle
 "In Your Room" — 4:24
 "Love Vibration" — 4:39

CD Digipak Single
 "In Your Room" 
 "In Your Room (12" Remix)" — 5:09
 "Love Vibration" — 4:39
 "In Your Room (12" Dub)" — 5:11
 "Love Vibration (Instrumental)" — 4:50

12" Vinyl
 A1 "In Your Room (12" Remix)" — 5:09
 A2 "In Your Room (12" Instrumental)" — 5:09
 B1 "Love Vibration" — 4:39
 B2 "Love Vibration (Instrumental)" — 4:39

Charts

End Of Year Charts

References

1992 debut singles
Toni Pearen songs
1992 songs
Mushroom Records singles
Songs written by Oliver Leiber
Songs written by John Shanks
Songs written by Ellen Shipley